Debra Lee Covey-Barnett (born September 7, 1961 in Biggar, Saskatchewan) is a former field hockey midfielder from Canada, who was a member of the Women's Senior National Team from 1985 to 1994. She earned a total number of 109 international caps for her native country. She was a member of the Canadian team at the 1992 Summer Olympics in Barcelona, Spain.

International senior competitions
 1986 – World Cup, Amstelveen (Bronze Medal)
 1987 – Champions Trophy, Amstelveen (4th)
 1987 – Pan American Games, Indianapolis (Bronze Medal)
 1988 – Olympic Games, Seoul (6th)
 1990 – World Cup, Sydney (10th)
 1991 – Pan American Games, Havana (Silver Medal)
 1992 – Olympic Games, Barcelona (7th)
 1994 – World Cup, Dublin (10th)

References

External links
 
 
 
 

1961 births
Living people
Canadian female field hockey players
Canadian field hockey coaches
Olympic field hockey players of Canada
Field hockey players at the 1988 Summer Olympics
Field hockey players at the 1992 Summer Olympics
Pan American Games medalists in field hockey
Pan American Games silver medalists for Canada
Pan American Games bronze medalists for Canada
Field hockey players at the 1987 Pan American Games
Field hockey players at the 1991 Pan American Games
Field hockey people from Saskatchewan
People from Biggar, Saskatchewan
Female sports coaches
Medalists at the 1991 Pan American Games
Medalists at the 1995 Pan American Games
Medalists at the 1987 Pan American Games